The Grigorovich I-1 was a Soviet fighter prototype of the 1920s. It was the first land-based fighter developed by the Grigorovich Design Bureau, who had previously concentrated on water-borne aircraft such as the Grigorovich M-5 of 1914.

Development
Initially, design was started on a single-seat fighter by Dmitry Pavlovich Grigorovich, to compete with the Polikarpov I-1 biplane. The finished aircraft, finalised in 1924 and produced at Factory No. 1, at Khodinka, near Moscow, was a single-seat, single-bay biplane of wooden construction, with the forward portion of the fuselage being covered in plywood and the rear having fabric skinning. In development, a major problem was that of engine cooling - various methods were tested including radiators attached to the undercarriage legs, but in the end a radiator suspended beneath the engine was used.

Operational history
After an initial flight in January 1924, testing took place in the spring of that year. The I-1 was found to have adequate speed for its purpose but its construction and therefore its flight were unstable, and its climb rate was found to be insufficient with repeated stalls. Therefore, the prototype was abandoned, and Grigorovich refined the design into the Grigorovich I-2 which later entered service in the Soviet Air Force.

Variants
Grigorovich I-2
Aerodynamically more refined version of the I-1, entered service in 1926.

Specifications (I-1)

See also

References

Biplanes
Grigorovich aircraft
1920s Soviet and Russian fighter aircraft
Aircraft first flown in 1924